Elmwood Park is a village in Cook County, Illinois, United States. The population was 24,521 at the 2020 census. The community has long maintained a large Italian-American population, with a more recent influx of Polish-American and Hispanic residents.

Geography

History
Elmwood Park was incorporated as a village in early April 1914 in order to prevent annexation by the greater city of Chicago. Today one can still see evidence of a minority of landowners, or share farmers who voted for annexation to the city in 1915 by the odd chunk taken out of Elmwood Park's northeast corner, which kept the community from achieving a full square rectangular border.

At the turn of the Century, urban dwellers would take a train on the Milwaukee Road, (which is now Canadian Pacific) westward out of the harsh concrete city for family picnics at the "Elm-Wood-Park," which was an ancient "Grove of majestic 180 year old Elms" found near 72nd Ave/Harlem and Irving Park Road. Taking advantage of the park's provenance, a new cemetery was named Elmwood, while the closest train stop to both cemetery and park in unincorporated Marwood/Ellsworth became identified with the official name of "Elmwood Park." During the pressure era of incorporation a decade later, the village's founding representatives thought it most ideal to legally title the community after the stop, and after the namesake elm, which is a native, locally evolved, riparian prairie "bottomland" tree species.

Demographics
As of the 2020 census there were 24,521 people, 9,223 households, and 5,979 families residing in the village. The racial makeup of the village was 63.68% White, 3.02% African American, 0.98% Native American, 3.18% Asian, 0.04% Pacific Islander, 15.65% from other races, and 13.45% from two or more races. Hispanic or Latino of any race were 35.07% of the population.

There were 9,223 households, out of which 49.95% had children under the age of 18 living with them, 46.55% were married couples living together, 12.43% had a female householder with no husband present, and 35.17% were non-families. 32.53% of all households were made up of individuals, and 12.73% had someone living alone who was 65 years of age or older. The average household size was 3.37 and the average family size was 2.61.

The village's age distribution consisted of 21.0% under the age of 18, 8.7% from 18 to 24, 27.2% from 25 to 44, 28% from 45 to 64, and 14.9% who were 65 years of age or older. The median age was 40.3 years. For every 100 females, there were 89.2 males. For every 100 females age 18 and over, there were 85.1 males.

The median income for a household in the village was $63,312, and the median income for a family was $84,159. Males had a median income of $40,257 versus $34,548 for females. The per capita income for the village was $31,248. About 4.0% of families and 6.6% of the population were below the poverty line, including 6.4% of those under age 18 and 6.1% of those age 65 or over.

Education
Elmwood Park's public schools are operated under Illinois Community Unit School District #401. The schools include:

High school
Elmwood Park High School

Middle school
Elm Middle School

Elementary schools
John Mills Elementary School
Elmwood Elementary School

Transportation 
Elmwood Park is accessible via the Elmwood Park station on Metra's Milwaukee District/West Line, which provides daily rail service between Elgin, Illinois, and Chicago Union Station, except on weekends when the Milwaukee service ends at the Elgin station (Illinois).

Sister city
  Frosinone, Lazio, Italy (from 1996)

Village Presidents
 1st Village President: Carl E. Johnson, Jr. Years Served: 1914-1915
 2nd Village President: Merritt B. Marwood Years Served: 1915-1920
 3rd Village President: Adolph H. Bracher Years Served: 1921-1923
 4th Village President: John R. Beck Years Served: 1924-1929
 5th Village President: Gerald R. Howe Years Served: 1929-1931
 6th Village President: Charles P. Hoehamer Years Served: 1931-1933
 7th Village President: Thomas Carey Years Served: 1933-1935
 8th Village President: John A. Cullerton Years Served: 1935-1948
 9th Village President: Adam J. Roulo Years Served: 1948-1953
 10th Village President: Elmer W. Conti Years Served: 1953-1985
 11th Village President: Don Storino Years Served: 1985-1987
 12th Village President: Richard G. Torpe Years Served: 1987-1989
 13th Village President: Peter N. Silvestri Years Served: 1989-2013
 14th and Current Village President: Angelo "Skip" Saviano Years Served: 2013-

Notable people

 Elmer W. Conti, Illinois businessman and politician
 John Giannini, college basketball coach
 Lee Loughnane, trumpet player and founding member of the rock band Chicago
 Jeff Mauro, television personality, Food Network
 Ray Nitschke, linebacker for the Green Bay Packers, member of the Pro Football Hall of Fame

References

External links

 Village of Elmwood Park official website
 Elmwood Park Public Library
 Elmwood Park Public Library Local History Blog
 Fifty Years of Life in Elmwood Park, at Illinois Digital Archives
 Eppllocalhistory Photostream at Flickr.com
 Elmwood Park Community Unit School District #401
 Elmwood Park Neighborhood Civic Organization
 St. Celestine Parish
 Elmwood Park Pony Baseball and Softball
 City Data
 Elmwood Park Bible Church
 Chicago Tribune Photo gallery: A history of Elmwood Park

Chicago metropolitan area
Italian-American culture in Illinois
Little Italys in the United States
Populated places established in 1914
Villages in Cook County, Illinois
Villages in Illinois
1914 establishments in Illinois
Polish-American culture in Illinois